Druzhby Street (romanised: úlitsa Drúzhby) is a street in Ramenki District, West Administrative District, Moscow. The name literally means the street of friendship and apparently commemorates the good moments in the Soviet-Chinese ties, and now China-Russia relations, since the embassy of the People's Republic of China is a major landmark of the street.

Lay-out
Druzhby Street is a short street running from Universitetsky Prospekt to Lomonosovsky Prospekt, perpendicular to each.

Notable buildings
 6 - Embassy of the People's Republic of China

Image gallery

External links 
Satellite picture by Google Maps

Streets in Moscow